The Federal Union Army is a military coalition in Myanmar (Burma) composed of fighters from various insurgent groups which are members of the United Nationalities Federal Council (UNFC). It was established by the UNFC to protect areas with ethnic minorities.

Membership 
The UNFC, the parent organisation of the FUA, currently has five members. Fighters in the FUA come from some of, but not all of, the member parties.

Ceasefire members 
 Chin National Front (suspended in November 2015)
 Karen National Union (resigned in September 2014)
 Karenni Army
 Lahu Democratic Union
 New Mon State Party
 Pa-O National Organization (suspended in November 2015)
 Shan State Army - North

Non-ceasefire members 
 Arakan Army 
 Kachin Independence Army (resigned in May 2017)
 Kuki National Army
 Ta'ang National Liberation Army (resigned in 2016)
 Wa National Organisation (resigned in May 2017)
 Zomi Revolutionary Army

References 

Paramilitary organisations based in Myanmar
Rebel groups in Myanmar